"Nobody But Me" is a song written by Shawn Camp and Philip White, and recorded by American country music singer Blake Shelton. It was released in August 2005 as the fourth and final single from his album Blake Shelton's Barn & Grill.
 
This song debuted at number 60 on the Hot Country Songs chart dated September 3, 2005. It charted for 36 weeks, and peaked at number 4 on the chart dated April 15, 2006. In addition, this song peaked at number 60 on the Billboard Hot 100.

Content
The song describes a man who is desperately begging a woman not to "go loving on nobody but [him]."

Music video
The music video was directed by Peter Zavadil and premiered in September 2005. It was filmed in Maine.

Charts

Weekly charts

Year-end charts

References

2005 singles
Blake Shelton songs
Songs written by Shawn Camp (musician)
Warner Records Nashville singles
Music videos directed by Peter Zavadil
2004 songs